Iligan Medical Center College (IMCC) is a private, non-sectarian higher education institution]] in Iligan City, Philippines.

History
In 1975, a group of five doctors recognized an inadequacy in experienced medical care and services in the Philippines.  They noted that this was partly because of a lack of trained personnel who are committed to render service, especially in rural areas and the government's slow delivery of such services to the general public.

A careful assessment of the problem led them to consider contributing to the training of personnel and finally deciding to put up an institution that will provide skillful and committed workforce in line with the medical field. Having no experience or formal training to manage an educational institution, they ventured anyway but with intense commitment and prayer that this noble intention would some day help solve the country's medical care and services problems. Thus in June 1975, the Iligan Medical School of Nursing and Midwifery was born.

Like any business venture in an unfamiliar field, the institution met tough problems. In its maiden years, only 37 students enrolled in the College of Nursing. Two years later the Department of Midwifery followed suit. At the start, only one building served as school and dormitory. The first graduation was held in 1978.

Strings of difficulties and problems started to crop up; soon afterward the incorporators thought of closing down the school. When news of closure were filtering out, the public got involved and together with the students convinced the owners of the school to hold on. Some interested parties, parents and friends were instrumental to alter the course of the school. A new leash in the life of the school was possible and survival was in the offing.

In the succeeding years, survival was not the issue anymore — development and growth were the new long-term goals.  With the relative growth of the paramedical courses, other allied courses were offered. To establish a far reaching impression, the name was changed to Iligan Medical Center College. The expansion of other paramedical courses was made possible with confidence and patronage of many parents and students and wider awareness of the competence of IMCC as an academic institution. The department of Physical Therapy, for example, was the first in the region.

The opening of Medical Technology, Radiologic Technology and other non-paramedical courses such as Applied Electronics, Practical Electricity, Refrigeration and Air-Conditioning soon were offered.  The name Iligan Medical Center College became a familiar name, equal if not above other local colleges.  Soon after, it was among the names in the directory of prominent medical schools in the country. IMCC graduates had consistently landed at the top among board passers in the allied board examination. Notably, the College of Radiologic Technology was recognized and named as best school in this field.

In the 1990s, there was a decrease in demand for paramedical courses graduates abroad since their schools were producing their own healthcare workers and prioritized local job employment. To keep IMCC competitive, and possibly reduce the impact of this event, the institution diversified its course offering to include more non-paramedical courses. With the rapid increase in technology — notably, computers  — IMCC responded with the opening of computer-related courses such as Computer Science, Information Technology, and Information Management. Furthermore, widening its horizon, it offered preschool, primary and secondary academic levels. Soon afterwards, Hotel and Restaurant Management, Tourism, Education and other courses were offered to meet the demand of industries and other employment entities.

The steady growth of IMCC brought to the vision of IMCC management to further its commitment; short-term programs supported this endeavor in a year-to-year basis. But its greatest desire is to become a university. In 1995, after assessing its potential, the grand plan was laid. The Graduate School was the initial venture, and that year the institution started enrolling students in the master's degree in Human Resources Management. To further its endeavor, in 1997 the college started concentrating its effort and prepared all its resources to achieve its desire to become a university.

Founders 

 MELCHOR B. PICARDAL, M.D., President, 1988–1994, Doctor of Medicine, Manila Central University
 VIRGILIO S. RIGOR, SR., M.D., President, Doctor of Medicine, University of the Philippines,
 RODOLFO R. TORRES, M.D., President, 1993–1995, Doctor of Medicine, University of Santo Tomas,
 SUSANO D. LAGTAPON, M.D., First President, 1975–1987, Doctor of Medicine, University of Santo Tomas,
 TEOFILO F. MONTERROYO Jr., M.D., Board of Director, Doctor of Medicine, University of the East,

Research Office
Research Director: Dr. Helen S. Tejero
Research Consultant: Paul Llido
Research Coordinator: Dindo Donald A. Manulat Jr.
Research Administrator: Jasmin P. Sumagang
Research Intelligence: Ivan Garde Redoblado

Research Centers
GLINTS (Green Lifestyle Inventions, Technology and Systems): Program Head: Dindo Donald A. Manulat Jr.
Biosphere Project: Program Head: Imelda S. Dela Rama

References

External links
IMCC official website
Iligan Medical Center Hospital official website

Medical schools in the Philippines
Universities and colleges in Iligan